Mieczysław Kasprzak (born 30 March 1953 in Ostrów) is a Polish politician. He was elected to Sejm on 25 September 2005, getting 7795 votes in 22 Krosno district as a candidate from the Polish People's Party list.

He was also a member of Sejm 1993-1997 and Sejm 2001-2005.

See also
Members of Polish Sejm 2005-2007

External links
Mieczysław Kasprzak - parliamentary page - includes declarations of interest, voting record, and transcripts of speeches.

Knights of the Order of Polonia Restituta
Members of the Polish Sejm 1993–1997
Members of the Polish Sejm 2001–2005
Members of the Polish Sejm 2005–2007
Members of the Polish Sejm 2007–2011
Members of the Polish Sejm 2011–2015
Members of the Polish Sejm 2015–2019
Members of the Polish Sejm 2019–2023
Polish People's Party politicians
United People's Party (Poland) politicians
1953 births
Living people
People from Jarosław County